Camp Jahoo is town and union council of Awaran District in the Balochistan province of Pakistan. During the floods of 2007 Camp Jahoo was badly affected - 145 households (642 people) were impacted.

References

Populated places in Awaran District
Union councils of Balochistan, Pakistan